Security Forces Headquarters – Jaffna (SFHQ-J) is a regional command of the Sri Lanka Army, that is responsible for the operational deployment and command all army units stationed in and around the Jaffna Peninsula in the Northern Province.

It is the most senior of the five Security Forces Headquarters and the General Officer Commanding it is one of the most senior officers in the army, the post is designated as Commander Security Forces Headquarters  – Jaffna. The current Commander SFHQ-J is Major General Ruwan Wanigasooriya. The SFHQ-J is based at the Palaly Military Base. At the height of the Sri Lankan Civil War, SFHQ-J included several divisions and the independent brigades. At certain times SFHQ-J would be under the command of an Overall Operational Commander.

History
The first permanent formation to be established in the Jaffna Peninsula since Ceylon gained its independence from the British in 1948 was the headquarters established by the Ceylon Army for "Operations Monty" in 1952 to stop illegal immigration of Indian Tamils. In 1963, "Operations Monty" was renamed Task Force Anti Illicit Immigration (TFAII), expanding its role in supporting the Royal Ceylon Navy coastal patrols and Ceylon Police Force operations in the Northern Province to intercept illicit immigration and smuggling. With the escalation of the Tamil militancy in the Jaffna Peninsula, TFAII was disbanded and replaced with the Task Force 4 Northern Command that served as a field formation for counter insurgency operations in the Northern Province. In 1982, it was renamed the Northern Command which became the permanent headquarters for army units based in the Northern Province, and in 1986 this headquarters was renamed as Security Forces Headquarters (Jaffna) in 1986. In late 1989, the headquarters and units attached to it was reorganized as the 21 Brigade. Following failed peace talks in 1994, and increased military operations in the Jaffna Peninsula, 21 Brigade was renamed Task Force 1. By 1996, Task Force 1 had a tactical area covering the Jaffna Peninsula and area up to Kilinochchi with several divisions under its command, therefore Task Force 1 HQ was converted as the Security Forces Headquarters – Jaffna.

Composition
SFHQ-J has three divisions under its command; 
51 Division, based in Jaffna
511 Brigade
512 Brigade
513 Brigade
515 Brigade
52 Division, based in the Jaffna Peninsula
521 Brigade
522 Brigade
523 Brigade
55 Division, based in Elephant Pass, Jaffna Peninsula 
551 Brigade
552 Brigade
553 Brigade
 Forward Maintenance Area (North)

Past Commanders
Task Force 4 Northern
 Colonel C.H. Fernando (1981 - 1983)
 Colonel A Ariyapperuma	(1983 - 1984) 
 Colonel 	S M A Jayawardena	(1983 - 1985)
 Lieutenant Colonel 	D E C Waidyaratne	(1985 - 1985)
 Colonel 	Gratian Silva	(1985 - 1985)
 Colonel 	C J Abeyratne 	(1985 - 1986)
Security Forces Headquarters (Jaffna) 
 Brigadier H F Rupasinghe 	(1986 - 1986)
 Brigadier G. H. De Silva 	(1986 - 1987)
 Brigadier J I De Jayaratne	(1987 - 1988)
 Brigadier T. N. De Silva	(1988 - 1989)
 Brigadier Y. Balaratnaraja	(1989 - 1989)
21 Brigade Headquarters
 Brigadier	 W I V K M Wimalaratne	(1991 - 1992) 
 Brigadier	 R de S Daluwatte	(1992 - 1992)
 Brigadier	 G P Kulatunga	(1992 - 1993)
 Brigadier	 J Nammuni	(1993 - 1993)
 Brigadier	 A K Jayawardena	(1993 - 1994)
Task Force 1 Headquarters
 Major General 	H S Hapuarachchi	(1995 - 1995)
 Brigadier	R P Liyanage 	(1995 - 1996)
 Brigadier 	L C R Gunawardena 	(1996 - 1996)
Security Forces Headquarters
 Major General	L P Balagalla	(1997 - 1998)
 Major General	L C R Gunawardena 	(1998 -	1999)
 Major General	P S C Munasinghe	(1999 - 1999)
 Major General	J K N Jayakodi 	(1999 - 2000)
 Major General	A M C W P Senevirathne 	(2000)
 Major General	G S C Fonseka 	(2000)
 Major General	A E D Wijendra 	(2000 - 2001)
 Major General	M D S Chandrapala 	(2001 - 2001)
 Major General	D S K Wijesooriya 	(2001 -	2002)
 Major General	G S C Fonseka (2002 - 2003)
 Major General	M D S Chandrapala 	(2003 - 2004)
 Major General	S D Thennakoon	(2004 - 2005)
 Major General	G A Chandrasiri 	(2005 - 2009)
 Major General	M C M P Samarasinghe 	(2009 - 2009)
 Major General	G R De Silva 	(2009 - 2009)
 Major General	L B R Mark 	(2009 - 2010)
 Major General	M Hathurusinghe 	(2010 - 2014)
 Major General	Udaya Perera 	(2014 - 2014)
 Major General	K J Alwis 	(2014 - 2015)
 Major General	N Udawatta 	(2015 - 2016)
 Major General	N U M M W Senanayake 	(2016 - 2017)
 Major General	D D U K Hettiarrachchi 	(2017 - 2019)
 Major General	P R Wanigasooriya 	(2019 - )

References

External links
www.cimicjaffna.com

Commands of the Sri Lanka Army
Government of Jaffna District